Naughty 40 is a 2017 Maldivian comedy film written, edited and directed by Yoosuf Shafeeu. Produced by Niuma Mohamed and Ismail Shafeeq under Envision Entertainment, the film stars Shafeeu, Mohamed Manik and Ahmed Saeed in pivotal roles. The film was released on 2 April 2017.

Plot
The film follows three friends, Ashwanee (Yoosuf Shafeeu), Ahsan (Ahmed Saeed) and Ajwad (Mohamed Manik) who are single and in their forties. Ashwanee, s girlfriend fled before they could marry. Divorcee Ajwad is bringing up his son, Jawad. Ahsan's wife died after giving birth to a boy. Nineteen years later, a man comes to Ashwanee to hand over a girl named Ashwa (Mariyam Azza), this being the final wish of her mother, Ziyaana. Ashwanee sees that Ashwa looks exactly like her mother. Ajwad's son invites him to the island where he has his business. Ajwad brings his two friends and their children. On the island, Ajwad, Ahsan and Ashwanee decide to mark their '40s' by dating younger girls from the island. However, Ajwad's business rival, Gulistan plans to scupper his business with the assistance of Zahid, the chief police officer of the island, and her younger sister Taniya (Fathimath Azifa).

In the climax Ajwad's ex-wife Niufa comes to reveal that Ashwa is Ajwad and Ziyaana's daughter. After knowing this Niufa refuse to live with Ajwad until he accept Ashwa as his daughter which later result in there divorce. All this years Niufa was looking after Ashwa after Ziyaana's death and according to Ziyaana's last wish, Niufa wants Ashwa to get her birth right. This is when Zahid reveal that it was he who is Ashwa's father. The film ends with Zahid accepting Ashwa as his daughter.

Cast 
 Yoosuf Shafeeu as Ashwanee
 Ahmed Saeed as Ahsan
 Mohamed Manik as Ajwad
 Fathimath Azifa as Taniya
 Ali Azim as Hassan
 Mariyam Azza as Ashwa  
 Ali Seezan as Zahid
 Ibrahim Jihad as Shamin
 Nuzuhath Shuaib as Zoya
 Gulisthan Mohamed as Gulisthan
 Niuma Mohamed as Niufa
 Mohamed Rifshan as Hanim
 Ahmed Shareef as Jawad
 Hassan Liam

Reception 
Naughty 40 garnered generally positive reviews from critics. Aishath Maaha of Avas favored the film specifically mentioning the comic timing of the characters and acting of the leads. However, Maaha opined that the "film is excessively long" and some scenes can be edited out. The film met with both critical and commercial success, emerging as one of the highest grossing Maldivian films of 2017.

Soundtrack

References

External links 
 

2017 films
2017 comedy films
Maldivian comedy films
Dhivehi-language films